We have met the enemy may refer to:
We have met the enemy and they are ours, part of a message from American naval officer Oliver Hazard Perry in 1813 after defeating and capturing Royal Navy ships in the Battle of Lake Erie
We have met the enemy and he is us, Pogo creator Walt Kelly's 20th century parody of Perry's quote